"Things Left to Do" is the ninth episode of the sixth season of the post-apocalyptic horror television series Fear the Walking Dead, the 78th episode overall,  "Things Left to Do" was released on the streaming platform AMC+ on April 15, 2021, in the United States and aired on television on AMC three days later, on April 18, 2021.

A stand-off occurs between Virginia (Colby Minifie), her rangers and Morgan's group. Ginny has made a lot of enemies and it's finally catching up to her. The episode marks the final appearance John Dorie (Garret Dillahunt) and Virginia portrayed by Colby Minifie, who is killed by June Dorie (Jenna Elfman).

Plot  
A devastated June (Jenna Elfman) digs a grave for John (Garret Dillahunt) and then grabs the gun that he was killed with, but Ranger Hill (Craig Nigh) stops her.  June asks Virginia (Colby Minifie) why Dakota (Zoe Colletti) murdered John. At night, Virginia and the Pioneers interrogate Sarah (Mo Collins), Daniel Salazar (Ruben Blades), Grace (Karen David), Luciana (Danay García) and Wes (Colby Hollman) to find the whereabouts of Morgan (Lennie James). After not learning anything, they beat Daniel and Virginia decides to kill Grace. Morgan appears and tells the Pioneers the truth about the murder of Cameron and Janis, and this causes Strand (Colman Domingo) and some of the Pioneers to turn on Virginia. When Virginia tries to shoot the group, Strand shoots her in the arm and a shootout begins. Virginia orders Hill to take Grace and the others hostage.

Morgan captures Virginia and escapes with her. The next day, he treats Virginia's wound and tells her he plans to keep her alive in order to save Grace and Daniel. Virginia reveals to Morgan that Dakota is actually her daughter. Later, Sherry (Christine Evangelista) and the masked men arrive in the SWAT truck, forcing Morgan and Virginia to flee. Virginia’s injury makes it difficult for her to run, and Sherry catches her. Morgan tells her that he cannot kill Virginia as he needs her to keep his friends safe. Sherry reluctantly lets them leave.

Morgan takes Virginia to his community and tells Alicia (Alycia Debnam-Carey), Dwight (Austin Amelio), Althea (Maggie Grace) and Charlie (Alexa Nisenson) that if Virginia dies, she would endanger the lives of Grace and Daniel and that they need to keep her safe. However, Strand, the rebel Pioneers, and Sherry's group arrive and demand justice from Morgan; Virginia accepts her fate. Morgan is about to execute Virginia in front of everyone, but can't bring himself to do it.

Later, Virginia confesses to Dakota that she is not her sister but instead her daughter, and Dakota rejects her. Sherry and Strand's group again demand Virginia be turned over to them, but Morgan tells them that killing her would not resolve anything. Morgan invites everyone to join his community, but Strand decides to remain with the Pioneers. In Virginia's cell, Alicia and Morgan tell her that she and Dakota are being exiled and will be killed if they return.  June stays with her while the others get Dakota, and both discuss their past conflicts concerning their daughters. Enraged by the murder of John, June realizes that everything that has happened was because of Virginia, and kills her. Having gotten her revenge, June leaves Morgan’s community.

Production 

The episode marks the final appearance of John Dorie (Garret Dillahunt), who was killed in the previous episode despite his death, the character's corpse and flashbacks appears in the episode. In turn, the episode marks the final appearance of Colby Minifie who portrays Virginia from the previous season in the episode "Leave What You Don't". Virginia is murdered by June Dorie (Jenna Elfman) who blamed her for the death of her husband.

Reception

Critical reception 
David S.E. Zapanta from Den of Geek! rated the episode 3.5 out of 5 and wrote: "It is a busy episode, with lots of competing factions and changes of heart and reunions and partings. Morgan is at the center of the action, of course, and Lennie James works his usual magic with the kind of complex moral dilemmas that have long been Fear's bread and butter." In a positive review, Erik Kain of Forbes said: "All told, this was a pretty decent episode. I didn’t like Virginia as a character and the Rangers/Pioneers are ridiculous from top to bottom so I’m glad to see her gone and her organization decimated."

Writing for "TV Fanatic", Paul Daily gave the episode 4.75 out of 5, considering it "another standout episode, one that will stick with me for years, thanks to the risks the writers are finally taking. The cast is throwing it out of the park, and you can tell they love the material." Emily Hannemann of TV Insider praised the episode, writing "Fear the Walking Dead's sixth season is shaping up to be one of its best, thanks to episodes with major moments like this."

Ratings 
The episode was seen by 1.12 million viewers in the United States on its original air date, below the previous episodes.

References

External links

 "Things Left to Do" at AMC.com
 

2021 American television episodes
Fear the Walking Dead (season 6) episodes